Meerewijck is the name of a recreation and living quarter in the Dutch province of South Holland. It is a part of the municipality of Kaag en Braassem, and is situated about 12 km south-west of Amsterdam.

Meerewijck consists of about 100 semi-bungalows which are grouped around a marina at the Ringvaart. Via the Ringvaart, several lakes such as the Braassemer Meer, the Westeinderplassen, and the Kagerplassen can be reached by boat within minutes.

External links
 coöp. verenig. Meerewijck 1 and 2

Populated places in South Holland
Kaag en Braassem